Elections in Utah are held to fill various local, state, and federal seats. Special elections may be held to fill vacancies at other points in time. 

Utah votes predominantly Republican. Self-identified Latter-day Saints are more likely to vote for the Republican ticket than non-Mormons. Utah is one of the most Republican states in the nation. Utah was the single most Republican-leaning state in the country in every presidential election from 1976 to 2004, measured by the percentage point margin between the Republican and Democratic candidates. In 2008 Utah was only the third-most Republican state (after Wyoming and Oklahoma), but in 2012, with Mormon Mitt Romney atop the Republican ticket, Utah returned to its position as the most Republican state. However, the 2016 presidential election result saw Republican Donald Trump carry the state with only a plurality, the first time this happened since 1992.

In a 2020 study, Utah was ranked as the 3rd easiest state for citizens to vote in.

Presidential

National legislative
2022 United States Senate election in Utah
2018 United States Senate election in Utah
2016 United States Senate election in Utah
2016 United States House of Representatives elections in Utah
2014 United States House of Representatives elections in Utah
2012 United States Senate election in Utah
2012 United States House of Representatives elections in Utah
2010 United States Senate election in Utah
2008 United States House of Representatives elections in Utah
2006 United States House of Representatives elections in Utah
2006 United States Senate election in Utah
2004 United States Senate election in Utah
1976 United States Senate election in Utah

State executive
2020 Utah gubernatorial election
2016 Utah gubernatorial election
2012 Utah gubernatorial election
2010 Utah gubernatorial special election
2008 Utah gubernatorial election
2004 Utah gubernatorial election
2000 Utah gubernatorial election
1996 Utah gubernatorial election
1992 Utah gubernatorial election

State legislative
2022 Utah elections
2020 Utah elections
2018 Utah elections
2016 Utah elections
2014 Utah elections
2012 Utah elections
2010 Utah elections

See also
Political party strength in Utah
Women's suffrage in Utah

References

External links
State of Utah Elections Office

 
 
  (State affiliate of the U.S. League of Women Voters)
 

 
Political events in Utah
Government of Utah